George Alfred Duffy (1887 – 1 April 1941) was a businessman and member of the Queensland Legislative Assembly.

Early life 
Duffy was born in Lismore, New South Wales, to parents Daniel Duffy and his wife Sarah Ann (née Beddoes). He was educated at Lismore Convent School before making his way to northern Queensland. There he conducted business in Yungaburra and Eacham.

On 12 September 1917 Duffy married Rosa Lilian Belson (died 1960) in Atherton and together had three sons.

Political career
Duffy represented the seat of Eacham for the CPNP from 1929 until 1932.

Later life 
Duffy died in 1941 at Albion and was buried in Lutwyche Cemetery.

References

Members of the Queensland Legislative Assembly
1887 births
1941 deaths
20th-century Australian politicians